Darsing Dahathum  was a village development committee in Syangja District in the Gandaki Zone of central Nepal. At the time of the 2011 Nepal census it had a population of 6598 people living in 1671 individual households. Bayarghari Bazaar is the common market of this village development committee. The small bazaar Bayarghari is one of the fastest growing bazaars of Syangja District. Most of the people living in this VDC are in the Indian Army. The national highway Siddhartha Highway passes by this VDC. There are several government schools including four private schools also. The main governmental school is Dahathum Higher Secondary School which is near Bayarghari.

References

External links
UN map of the municipalities of Syangja District

Populated places in Syangja District